Liaison psychiatry, also known as consultative psychiatry or consultation-liaison psychiatry is the branch of psychiatry that specialises in the interface between general medicine/pediatrics and psychiatry, usually taking place in a hospital or medical setting. The role of the consultation-liaison psychiatrist is to see patients with comorbid medical conditions at the request of the treating medical or surgical consultant or team. Consultation-liaison psychiatry has areas of overlap with other disciplines including psychosomatic medicine, health psychology and  neuropsychiatry.

Scope

Liaison psychiatry usually provides a service to patients in a general medical hospital, either inpatients, outpatients or attenders at the emergency department. Referrals are made when the treating medical team has questions about a patient's mental health, or how that patient's mental health is affecting his or her care and treatment. Typical issues include:

 Patients with medical conditions that cause/exacerbate psychiatric or behavioral problems, such as delirium.
 Supporting the management of patients with mental disorders who have been admitted for the treatment of medical problems.
 Assisting with assessment of the capacity of a patient to consent to treatment.
 Patients who may report physical symptoms as a result of a mental disorder, or patients with medically unexplained physical symptoms.
 Patients who may not have a psychiatric disorder but are experiencing distress related to their medical problems.
 Patients who have attempted suicide or self-harm.
 Assisting with the diagnosis, treatment and functional assessment of people with dementia, including advice on discharge planning or the need for long-term care.

The psychiatric team liaises with many other services, including the treating medical team, other mental health services, social services, and community services. There is increasing interest on extending liaison psychiatry to primary care, for the management of long-term medical conditions such as diabetes mellitus.

Effectiveness of liaison psychiatry

Consultation-liaison psychiatry helps improve patients' coping mechanisms, treatment adherence, school/work re-integration and quality of life. An evaluation of the Rapid Assessment, Interface and Discharge (RAID) model of liaison psychiatry — employed at City Hospital, Birmingham — estimated that the service saved between 43 and 64 beds per day through reduced lengths of stay and prevention of readmission. In 2011 the Centre for Mental Health published an economic evaluation of the service, estimating savings of around £3.5 million. This was followed in 2012 by the publication of a report recommending that every NHS hospital should have a liaison psychiatry service as standard.

History
The history of liaison psychiatry is partly a history of psychiatry and medicine. Galen was highly influential for over 1500 years in medicine particularly advocating the use of experimentation to advance knowledge. The polymath physician Avicenna produced many insights into medicine but only became influential in Western medicine when William Harvey's elucidation of the circulatory system forced a re-evaluation of Galen's work. The French philosopher René Descartes began the dualistic debate on the division between mind and body. Johann Christian August Heinroth is credited with the origination of the term psychosomatic illness. At the beginning of the 19th century Johann Christian Reil created the term psychiatry whilst the polymath Benjamin Rush wrote Diseases of the Mind. The philosopher Spinoza's concept of conatus, Mesmer's development of hypnosis together with Charcot's refinement of this technique influenced Sigmund Freud whose development of psychoanalytic theory was to have a profound impact on the development of liaison psychiatry. Under the guidance of Alan Gregg, psychoanalysis impacted on hospital medicine through figures such as Franz Alexander, Stanley Cobb and Felix Deutsch.

Edward Billings first coined the term "liaison psychiatry." The publishing of two texts A Handbook of Elementary Psychobiology and Psychiatry, by Billings, and Psychosomatic Medicine, by Edward Weiss and O. Spurgeon English, outlined the theoretical foundations for the developing field. George L. Engel was involved in the development of liaison psychiatry and coined the term Biopsychosocial model which overcame divisions created by Cartesian mind-body dualism and was to have wider repercussions on psychiatric practice.

United Kingdom

The Faculty of Liaison Psychiatry was established within the Royal College of Psychiatrists in 1997. The European Association for Consultation Liaison Psychiatry and Psychosomatics also produced a set of guidelines for training in Liaison Psychiatry. The American Psychiatric Association formally recognized C-L psychiatry as a subspecialty in 2004, with its own sub-specialty board exam. The profession debated about the best term for this specialty, finally settling on "Psychosomatic Medicine".

A survey for NHS England in 2015 found 133 out of 179 A&E departments could not deliver the minimum core standard for 24/7 liaison psychiatry.  11 hospitals had no liaison psychiatry service, and only 35 delivered at or above the minimum standards. Collectively there was a shortage of 1,270 trained nurses and 230 trained consultants.

References

External links
 Academy of Consultation-Liaison Psychiatry
 American Psychosomatic Society
 European Association of Psychosomatic Medicine
 The Royal College of Psychiatrists - Faculty of Liaison Psychiatry
 Centre for Mental Health research into liaison psychiatry services in the UK

Psychiatric specialities